Rachel Dodson is an American comic book inker, who often works with her husband, Terry Dodson. Her work includes Marvel Knights: Spider-Man, Spider-Man/Black Cat: The Evil that Men Do and Avenging Spider-Man for Marvel Comics and Wonder Woman and Harley Quinn for DC Comics.

Bibliography
Dodson has been inking comics since 1994.

Variant covers
Action Comics #17
Poison Ivy: Cycle of Life and Death #1
He-Man and The Masters of The Universe #1
Superwoman #1 - 3
Wonder Woman #38, 44, 46
The Amazing Spider-Man (Vol. 6) #14, 19-20

Covers
Catwoman #21 - 22, 24 - 26, 28 - 34
Catwoman: Vol. 5: Race of Thieves
Catwoman: Future's End #1
Coloring DC: Harley Quinn and the Suicide Squad Vol. 1
DC Comics Bombshells Annual #1
Harley Quinn: Night and Day
Harley Quinn: Welcome to Metropolis
Teen Titans: Earth One

Artist
Harley Quinn: Night and Day
Harley Quinn: Welcome to Metropolis
Teen Titans: Earth One
The Art of DC Comics Bombshells

Inker
Teen Titans: Earth One

Marvel Comics

Inker
Avengers (2010) #33
Defenders (2011) #5
Point One (2011) #1
The Uncanny X-Men (1963) #504 - 507, 511, 513, 518–520, 529
Dark Avengers/Uncanny X-Men: Exodus (2009) #1
Secret Invasion: X-Men (2008) #1-4
Young X-Men (2008) #3-7
Spider-Man/Black Cat: The Evil That Men Do (2002) #1-6
Marvel Knights Spider-Man (2004) #2-4, 6-7, 9-12
The Amazing Spider-Man (Vol. 6) #14, 19-20
Wolverine (1988) #186
Wolverine Legends Vol. 3: Law of the Jungle tpb
Daredevil (1998) #40
Deadpool (1997) #-1

Artist
Avengers (2010) #34
Defenders (2011) #1 - 3

References

External links
 Barker, Aaron (August 14, 2006). "Beautiful Music Together: Terry and Rachel Dodson". Wizard.

Living people
Year of birth missing (living people)
American female comics artists
Marvel Comics people
DC Comics people